Ranbir may refer to:

Ranbir Kapoor (born 1982), Indian actor who appears in Bollywood movies
Rana Ranbir, Indian actor
Ranbir pura, small village in Patiala District near the Bhakhra Canal on Sangrur Road and also on Nabha road
Ranbir Rano, Hindi television series on Zee TV channel from September 22, 2008 – May 28, 2009
Ranbir Singh GCSI, CIE, Kaiser-i-Hind (1830–1885), the son of Maharaja Gulab Singh, Maharaja of Jammu and Kashmir
Ranbir Singh Hooda (1914–2009), leading member of the Indian National Congress; played a role in India's freedom struggle
Ranbir Singh Kanwar (born 1930), plant breeder and agronomist who helped usher in the green revolution in India
Ranbir Singh Mahendra, politician from Haryana, India and a former president of the BCCI
Ranbir Singh of Jind (1879–1948), the first Maharaja of Jind and the last ruler of the state of Jind, reigning from 1887 to 1948
Ranbir Singh Pora, town and a notified area committee in Jammu district in the Indian state of Jammu and Kashmir or srinagar
Ranbir (newspaper)

Indian masculine given names